The Crane Melon is an heirloom melon developed by Oliver Crane in the early 20th century. The melon is an edible gourd said to have sweet and fruity flesh.

Characteristics 
The Crane Melon is a variety that was developed in the early 1900s in Penngrove, near Santa Rosa, California. It is grown and sold at specialty grocery stores and markets and it was first available from the Crane Melon Barn located between Rohnert Park, California and Santa Rosa.  A ripe melon can range from four to seven pounds and has orange flesh.

Recognition
The Crane Melon has appeared in magazines, newspapers, and TV shows. It is on the Ark of Taste: Slow Food USA. It was recognized as an heirloom by a Los Angeles Times article, since "the original heirloom concept applies most readily to vegetables and the few fruits, chiefly melons, that are propagated by seed." To be considered an heirloom, the history of a fruit or vegetable cultivar should also be between 50 and 75 years long.

History

Crane Family 
Richard Hope Crane moved from Missouri to California during the gold rush in 1849. In 1852 he settled down in the Santa Rosa region of Sonoma County. The Crane Melon Barn was built in 1868 at 4935 Petaluma Hill Road.

Crane Melon
In 1920 Oliver Crane, Richard Crane's son, developed the heirloom Crane Melon. He crossed several varieties of melons including a Japanese melon, a Persian melon, an ambrosia melon, and a white melon. The Crane Melon cannot be found in grocery stores. It is farmed at the Crane Melon Barn where it is vine-ripened and therefore does not have the shelf life required to be suitable for shipping. “The Crane melon’s flavor is due to its terroir. The melon was developed to be grown in a particular soil, within a specific climate zone, farmed in a certain style.”

References 

Melons